T.S. Mall is a shopping mall in East District, Tainan, Taiwan that opened on February 11, 2015 (trial operation on December 30, 2014). Jointly developed by Tainan Spinning Co., Ltd. and Uni-President Enterprises Corporation, it is the largest shopping mall in Tainan.

History
The location of T.S. Mall was a racecourse during the Japanese occupation. After the war, it was bought by Tainan Spinning Co., Ltd. and established the main factory building of the company when it was founded.

The first phase is T.S. Mall A1 Hall, Hotel Royal Tainan, Nanfang International Building, Times Park, and the second phase is T.S. Mall A2 Hall. The third phase is a boutique department store and a five-star hotel, and the fourth phase is a residential skyscraper.

Hall A2 is a 9-story building with 2 floors above ground. On March 19, 2018 construction started and was completed in November 2020. Trial operation started on December 25, 2020 and it officially opened on March 31, 2021. The skybridge on the 2nd to 3rd floors above the ground and the connecting passage on the 1st floor underground lead to Hall A1.

Gallery

See also
 List of tourist attractions in Taiwan

References

External links

 

2015 establishments in Taiwan
Shopping malls in Tainan
Shopping malls established in 2015